"Who's Going Home With You Tonight?" is the first single from American rock band Trapt's 2008 album Only Through the Pain.

This song is also available as downloadable content for the Rock Band games.

Other media appearances
This song was featured on a September 27, 2008 episode of Cheaters where the crew and Kari Ivy confronted her boyfriend and his companion at a Trapt concert in Dallas, Texas.

References

2008 singles
Trapt songs
Song recordings produced by Garth Richardson
2008 songs
Eleven Seven Label Group singles